Floyd Dale Grubb is a former member of the Indiana House of Representatives, representing the 42nd District since 1988. He is a member of the Democratic Party.

Born on June 26, 1949 in Fountain County, Indiana, Dale is the son of William H. Grubb, a farmer in Covington, Indiana and Laveda B. Davis.  The family is descended from John Grubb who came to the Delaware Valley from Cornwall in 1677 and served in the Pennsylvania Colonial Assembly.  In 1965, Dale also demonstrated an early interest in politics when he became a page in the Indiana Assembly.  Two years later, he was elected as a democratic precinct captain.  He continued his interest in public issues while majoring in agricultural economics at Purdue.  After graduation, he joined the Indiana Air Force Reserves and trained as a nurse.  Dale started his business career at a bank in Michigan City, Indiana, but returned to the Covington farm in 1974.  He also established a grain and commodity brokerage in 1980.

In 1988, the local Assembly seat became vacant and Dale was elected that November.  Dale has been a leading advocate for agricultural interests and was the prime sponsor of organ donor legislation.  He is also noted for his strong opposition to eastern daylight saving time that causes serious problems in western Indiana because of its proximity to Illinois, which is in the central time zone.  After only six years in office, Assembly democrats elected Grubb as their leader.  While the registration in his district is evenly divided, Dale consistently receives over 60% of the votes.

In 2012 Grubb retired.

Family
Grubb is married to his wife Phyllis and together they have 7 children.

Education
In 1971, Grubb received his BS from Purdue University.

Professional experience
Dale is currently a farmer
From 1971 to 1977, Grubb served in the United States Air Force Reserves
He also worked at Grub Grain as a farmer and agriculture economist

References

Indiana State Legislature – Representative F. Dale Grubb Official government website
Project Vote Smart – Representative Floyd Dale 'Dale' Grubb (IN) profile
Follow the Money – F Dale Grubb
2006 2004 2002 2000 1998 1996 1994 campaign contributions

Democratic Party members of the Indiana House of Representatives
1949 births
Living people
American people of Cornish descent
People from Covington, Indiana